Vermont Counterpoint is a minimalist composition for amplified flute and tape written by the American composer Steve Reich in 1982. It was commissioned and premiered by the flutist Ransom Wilson.  The piece has a duration of roughly 10 minutes and is dedicated to the American philanthropist Betty Freeman.

References

External links
 "Vermont Counterpoint" at allmusic.com

Compositions by Steve Reich
1982 compositions
Music commissioned by ensembles or performers